Jason Carter is an American bluegrass musician who plays fiddle.  He is best known for his work with the Del McCoury Band and the Travelin' McCourys.

Biography
Jason Carter was born in Ashland, Kentucky on February 1, 1973.

At the age of 8 he started playing guitar.  He picked up the mandolin a few years later.  He started playing fiddle at age 16 after hearing Del McCoury for the first time.  Following high school graduation in 1991, he joined The Goins Brothers, who he played with for six-months.  During his time with the Goins Brothers, at a show in Nashville, Tennessee with Del McCoury, Carter approached McCoury and asked him for a job in his band.  After a brief-tour that served as his audition, Carter was hired.  He has been with the Del McCoury Band ever since.  He has played with the Travelin' McCourys since their formation in 2009.

In 2015 he was inducted into the Country Music Highway/ U.S. Route 23 in Greenup County, Kentucky.

He has been named the International Bluegrass Music Association fiddle player of the year five times ('97, '98, '03, '13, '14).

Over the years Carter has recorded with and performed with a number of musicians including Leftover Salmon, Yonder Mountain String Band, Dierks Bentley, Mac Wiseman, John Prine, The Osborne Brothers, June Carter, Marty Stuart, Lonesome River Band, Ricky Skaggs, Patty Loveless, Vince Gill, Ralph Stanley, Gibson Brothers (bluegrass duo), Sierra Hull, Sam Bush, Tony Rice, Jerry Douglas and Bela Fleck

He has also appeared on the Late Show with David Letterman, the Conan O'Brien show, Jimmy Kimmel Live!, and The Tonight Show Starring Jimmy Fallon.

Recordings
In addition to his work with the Del McCoury Band, Carter has released two solo albums, 1997's On The Move and 2022's Lowdown Hoedown.

Discography

Solo recordings
 1997: On The Move, Rounder
 2022: Lowdown Hoedown, Fiddleman Records

References

Bluegrass musicians from Kentucky
1971 births
Living people
The Travelin' McCourys members
American country fiddlers
Del McCoury Band members